The Ontario International Airport Authority (OIAA) is an airport authority that governs  Ontario International Airport in Ontario, California.

The OIAA was created in August 2012 under a joint-powers agreement between the City of Ontario, California, and San Bernardino County.

The OIAA oversees the operation of Ontario International Airport, having gained operational control of the airport from Los Angeles World Airports on November 1, 2016.

References

2012 establishments in California
Airport operators of the United States
Government agencies established in 2012
Transportation in San Bernardino County, California